The 2023 Canadian Premier League season will be the fifth season of the Canadian Premier League, the top level of Canadian soccer. The 2023 CPL playoff champion and 2023 CPL regular season winner will both earn berths in the newly expanded 2024 CONCACAF Champions League. Forge FC are the defending CPL champions, having beaten Atlético Ottawa in the 2022 final. Atlético Ottawa are the defending regular season winners.

Team and rule changes
Eight teams are expected to compete in the 2023 season, with Vancouver FC scheduled to debut, and FC Edmonton being terminated by the league. The player compensation budget increased by $175,000 compared to 2022. Teams must spend between $750,000 and $1,025,000 on their rosters with a minimum of $30,000 per player. A team making full use of the U21 salary rule can reach a compensation maximum of $1,125,000. The league's play-off structure changed to a 5-team Page playoff system with four elimination matches and one non-elimination match.

Teams

Stadiums and locations

Personnel and sponsorship

Number of teams by province or territory

Coaching changes

Regular season

Format
The regular season was played as a quadruple round-robin, with each team playing the other seven teams twice at home and twice away between April 15 and October 7. The regular season winner, the team ranked first after all 28 games, qualifies for the 2024 CONCACAF Champions League and the top five teams qualify for the playoffs.

Standings

Results

Playoffs
The 2023 season will use the Page playoff system. The team who finishes first in the regular-season table will play the team who finishes second, and the winner will host the final. The fourth- and fifth-placed teams will play in a play-in round, the winner of this game will play the third-placed team in a quarter-final. The quarter-final winner will play the loser of the game between the first and second placed teams for the other spot in the final.

Bracket

Player transfers

U Sports Draft
The 2023 CPL–U Sports Draft is scheduled to take place on December 15, 2022. Each team will make two picks in the draft for a total of 16 selections with expansion club Vancouver FC selecting first.

Foreign players 

Canadian Premier League teams can sign a maximum of seven international players, out of which only five can be in the starting line-up for each match. Teams are required to carry a minimum of four international players, either signed through or approved by the league's scouting partner, 21st Club. At least 50% of a team's international players must be U23 at all times. If a club wishes to utilize the maximum 7 slots, the 7th player must be U21.

The following international players have signed for the 2023 season. Note that players may be considered domestic for CPL purposes (Canadian citizens, permanent residents, or refugees) while still representing other countries in international competitions.

Players in italic denote players new to their respective clubs for the 2023 season, sorted chronologically by their announcement.

2024 CONCACAF Champions League
The 2023 CPL playoff champion and 2023 CPL regular season champion will both earn berths in the newly expanded 2024 CONCACAF Champions League, competing against teams from across North America, Central America and Caribbean for a spot in the FIFA Club World Cup. Qualification for the CONCACAF Champions League is also available to CPL clubs by winning the Canadian Championship.

Should a CPL club hold multiple CCL qualification slots, then the CPL club(s) which has accumulated the most regular season league points will earn the remaining slot(s).

Notes

References 

Canadian Premier League seasons
Canadian Premier League